Robert Elisha Foster (November 26, 1851 - April 30, 1931) was a Democratic member of the Mississippi House of Representatives, representing Issaquena County, from 1912 to his death.

Biography 
Robert Elisha Foster was born on November 26, 1851, in Linden, Copiah County, Mississippi. He was the son of Milton Hunter Foster (c. 1823–1905), and his wife Hannah Elizabeth (Greenlee) Foster.

Political career 
From 1884 to 1910, Robert was a member and president of the Board of Supervisors of Issaquena County, Mississippi. He was first elected to the Mississippi House of Representatives, representing that county as a Democrat, on November 5, 1911. He was re-elected in 1915. He was also elected in 1919, 1923, and 1927, serving until his death. Foster, while still a member of the House, died after a two-week illness on April 30, 1931 in Mississippi. At 79 years old, he was the oldest serving member of the Legislature at the time of his death. He was succeeded in the House by J. C. Newman.

Personal life 
He married Nannie E. Heath in 1877. They had three children, Annie Eliza (Foster) Ellis (b. 1877), Robert Heath Foster (b. 1885), and Mary Lurline (Foster) Donald (b. 1887). After Nannie's death, he married Louise Lee White in 1917. He had at least two children with Louise: Nannie E. Foster and Louise Foster.

References

External links 

 Robert Elisha Foster at Find a Grave

1851 births
1931 deaths
Democratic Party members of the Mississippi House of Representatives
People from Copiah County, Mississippi
People from Issaquena County, Mississippi